Cushina is a townland in County Offaly on the Cushina River at the junction of the R400 and R419 regional roads.

It is 4 km north of Portarlington.

See also
 List of townlands of County Offaly

References

Townlands of County Offaly